T70 or T-70 can refer to:

 T-70 tank, a 1940s Soviet Union tank
 Canon T70, a 1984 single-lens reflex camera
 Lola T70, a 1960s sports car 
 T-70, a fictional robot from Terminator series
 T70 GMC, an early prototype to M18 Hellcat.
 T-70, the Star Wars Episode VII:  The Force Awakens version of the X-wing fighter